Vladislav III (? – 1525) was the nephew of Vladislav II of Wallachia and Voivode (Prince) of Wallachia from April 1523 until November of that same year. He regained the throne in June 1524, only to lose it again that September. He regained the throne a final time in April 1525 and ruled until August of the same year.

|-

House of Dănești
Rulers of Wallachia
Year of birth unknown
Year of death unknown
History of Wallachia (1512–1714)
16th-century rulers in Europe